Sick Society is the sixth studio album by the American heavy metal band Chastain, released in 1995 through Leviathan Records. It is the first album after five years released by David T. Chastain under the name Chastain and the first to feature the singer Kate French, who replaced Leather Leone.

Track listing
All songs by David T. Chastain and Kate French, except tracks 1, 2, 6, 7 by David T. Chastain

"I Know the Darkness" – 5:16
"Sick Society" - 4:55
"Violence in Blame" - 5:59
"Those Were the Daze" - 4:47
"Destructive Ground" - 4:58
"To the Edge" - 5:20
"The Price of War" - 4:16
"Every Emotion" - 5:08
"The Vampire" - 5:21
"Sugarcaine" - 4:52
"Love and Hate" - 3:46
"Angel Falls" - 7:04

Personnel

Band members
Kate French — lead and backing vocals, rhythm guitar, bass, keyboards, co-producer
David T. Chastain - lead and rhythm guitars, guitar synth, acoustic guitar, bass, keyboards, backing vocals, producer
Dennis Lesh — drums, keyboards

Production
Jeff Higgins — engineer, mixing
David Shew — engineer, digital editing

References

1995 albums
Chastain (band) albums